William Forsyth was a rugby union international who represented Scotland in the first international rugby match in 1871.

Early life
William Forsyth was born on 23 March 1850 in Logie Easter, Ross-shire. He was the son of John Forsyth (died 1898) and Ann (née Bell) (died 1857). John, at the time, was a farmer on the Balnagowan estate, the seat of Sir Charles Ross and site of Balnagowan castle. Later, in the 1860s, John Forsyth would become the factor of the whole estate, some 300,000 acres, of which about 8000 acres were arable, 400 acres under wood, and 288,000 acres under pasture. William's mother died in 1857 when he was just seven years old and his aunt moved in, helping to look after William and his siblings. John would later remarry. In around 1869, William began attending Edinburgh University. He was noted in the 1869 Edinburgh calendar (as William Forsyth of Ross-shire) for earning a certificate of merit and later was cited as William Forsyth of Balnagowan.

Rugby union career
Whilst at Edinburgh University William Forsyth was a noted athlete and rugby footballer. He was on the Edinburgh union's rugby committee in 1871 and in 1871 was selected to represent Scotland in the first international match against England. This was played on 27 March 1871 at Raeburn Place, Edinburgh and won by Scotland.  He was one of two representatives from Edinburgh University. After this match he continued to play for Edinburgh University and in the oldest known picture of any university sporting club, he is pictured alongside his teammates for the 1872/3 season. In that team were also Cathcart and Stewart.

In the first intercity match between Glasgow and Edinburgh in 1872, William Forsyth is notably absent from the Edinburgh line-up. In the side however was a J Forsyth, representing Wanderers. Given W Forsyth was still playing for Edinburgh in that season, and that J Forsyth was a Wanderers player, it is unlikely they are the same man. But there is evidence to suggest that Forsyth may have on occasion been given the initial "J". Certain sources for the 1871 International quote Forsyth's initial as being J rather than W. The argument that it was W Forsyth being the 1871 international is bolstered by the fact that he is the same man pictured in both the 1871 Scotland side and in the 1872 Edinburgh University side, and all records of the university show him as W or William Forsyth. 
In Francis Marshall's 1892 publication, Football; the Rugby union game, he is once again referred to as W Forsyth in a picture of the 1871 Scotland side although on another occasion he is referred to as R Forsyth.

In addition to rugby, Forsyth was also a noted athlete whilst at University. In 1871 he is recorded as having won the mile walk in 8 minutes at the Edinburgh University Club meet, on 23 June.

References

1850 births
Alumni of the University of Edinburgh
Edinburgh University RFC players
Rugby union forwards
Rugby union players from Highland (council area)
Scotland international rugby union players
Scottish rugby union players
1935 deaths